Lena is an unincorporated community in Miami County, in the U.S. state of Ohio.

History
Lena was originally called Elizabethtown, and under the latter name was laid out in 1830, and named for Elizabeth Robbins, the wife of a first settler. Another former variant name was Allen's, after Sylvanus Allen, a local postmaster. A post office called Allens was established in 1830, the name was changed to Lena in 1883, and the post office closed in 1914.

Notable person
A. B. Graham, an Ohio State University professor, was born near Lena in 1868.

References

Unincorporated communities in Miami County, Ohio
Unincorporated communities in Ohio